Sharaf al-Din and Sharif al-Din are two related male Muslim given names. The Turkish form of the name is Şerafettin. They may refer to:

Sharaf al-Din Qaraqush (d. 1212), Ayyubid commander and adventurer
Abd al-Husayn Sharaf al-Din al-Musawi (1872–1957), Shi'a twelver Islamic scholar
Abdullah-Al-Muti Sharfuddin (1930–1998), Bangladeshi educationalist and popular science writer
Al-Hadi Sharaf ad-Din (1820–1890), claimant for the Zaidi imamate of Yemen
Sharaf ad-Din Ali Yazdi (died 1454), 15th-century Persian historian
Sharaf al-Dīn al-Ṭūsī (1135–1213), Persian mathematician and astronomer of the Islamic Golden Age
Sharafuddin of Selangor (born 1945), sultan of Selangor, Malaysia since November 2001
Sharfuddin Abu Tawwama (d. c. 1300), Islamic scholar based in Bengal
Sharfuddin Shah Wilayat, early Iraqi Sufi, active in India
Sheikh Sharaf ad-Din ibn al-Hasan (died 1258), head of the ‘Adawiyya Ṣūfī Order
Syed Sharifuddin Pirzada (1923–2017), Pakistani lawyer and politician
 Shaikh Sharafuddeen Bu Ali Qalandar Panipati, known as Bu Ali Shah Qalandar, thirteenth century Azerbaijani-Indian Sufi saint
Sharfuddin (politician), Indian politician from Bihar

Şerafettin
 Kötü Kedi Şerafettin, Turkish comic series about the anthropomorphical cat of same name. Later adapted on film as Bad Cat.
 Şerafettin Elçi (1938–2012), Turkish politician of Kurdish origin
 Şerafettin Işık, pen-name of Hamit Zübeyir Koşay (1897–1984), Turkish archaeologist, ethnographer, writer and folklore researcher
 Şerafettin Taşliova, or Şeref Taşlıova (born 1938), Turkish poet and storyteller
 Şero, mascot cat of Turkey's Republican People's Party headquarters

Arabic masculine given names